Saal may refer to:

Places in Germany
Saal an der Donau, in the district of Kelheim, Bavaria
Saal an der Saale, in the district Rhön-Grabfeld, Bavaria
Saal, Mecklenburg-Vorpommern, in the district Vorpommern-Rügen, Mecklenburg-Vorpommern
 Saal Railway a 153 kilometre-long double-track main line of the German railways

People
 Devon Saal (born 1992), South African footballer 
 Georg Saal (1817-1870), German painter
 George Saal (1918-1996), Illinois politician and businessman
 Harry Saal, American technology entrepreneur
 Ignaz Saal (1761–1836), operatic bass and comedian
 Jason Saal (born 1975), American professional ice hockey player

Other uses
Saal Bulas syndrome listed as a "rare disease" by the Office of Rare Diseases (ORD) of the National Institutes of Health (NIH)
Maria Saal, a market town in the district of Klagenfurt-Land in Austria
Garthan Saal is Supernova aka Nova Omega, a fictional character in the Marvel Comics Universe
Saal (Serengeti album), a 2013 album by alternative hip hop artist Serengeti
Saal, a former name of the Mayan ancient city Naranjo, now in Petén Department, Guatemala

See also
Sal (disambiguation)
Bees Saal Baad (1962 film), a Bollywood film
Bees Saal Pehle, a 1972 Bollywood drama film
Solva Saal, a 1958 Hindi movie